Ogilvia is a monotypic snout moth genus described by George Hampson in 1930. Its only species, Ogilvia pulverealis, was described by the same author but in 1899. It is found in Yemen.

References

Phycitinae
Monotypic moth genera
Moths of Asia